Bedri Gürsoy (1902 in Kadıköy, İstanbul – 4 February 1994 in Moda, Kadıköy, İstanbul) was a Turkish football player, who played for Fenerbahçe. He played as a left winger or left forward. He is regarded as one of the best left forwards in Turkish football history.

He played 134 matches and scored 34 goals for Fenerbahçe between 1921-28. He won the 1920–21 and 1922-23 Istanbul League Championships. After his retirement he functioned as a board member of Fenerbahçe S.K. He was included in the General Harington Cup squad.

He was included in the first squad of the Turkey national football team that played against Romania on 26 October 1923. He was included in the national squad that competed in the 1924 Summer Olympics.

References

External links
Profile @ TFF.org

1902 births
1994 deaths
People from Kadıköy
Turkish footballers
Turkey international footballers
Fenerbahçe S.K. footballers
Fenerbahçe S.K. board members
Olympic footballers of Turkey
Footballers at the 1924 Summer Olympics
Footballers at the 1928 Summer Olympics
Footballers from Istanbul
Association football forwards